Villaverde Alto, casco histórico de Villaverde, or just Villaverde Alto is a ward (barrio) of Madrid belonging to the district of Villaverde.

Wards of Madrid
Villaverde (Madrid)